Denlow is an unincorporated community in north central Douglas County in the Ozarks of Missouri. Denlow is located on Missouri Route 76, just west of the Fox Creek bridge.

History
A post office called Denlow was established in 1896, and remained in operation until 1919. An early variant name was "Upshaw".

References

Unincorporated communities in Douglas County, Missouri
1896 establishments in Missouri
Unincorporated communities in Missouri